Ozay Mehmet (born 1938, in Nicosia, Cyprus) is professor emeritus of international affairs at Carleton University in Ottawa, Ontario. He has several academic books on economic development and more than one hundred articles in scholarly journals. In retirement he has published historical novels on Cyprus. He lives with his family in Ottawa and spends part of the year in Cyprus.

Biography
Mehmet was born in 1938 in Nicosia, Cyprus into a Turkish Cypriot family. He studied at the London School of Economics between 1959 and 1962. Subsequently, he received his MA and PhD in economics at the University of Toronto on a Canadian Commonwealth Scholarship. He has taught at various Canadian universities including: the University of Windsor, York University, the University of Toronto, the University of Ottawa and Carleton University. Mehmet is a specialist in economic development, with special reference to Asian Tigers, Turkey and Cyprus. He has consulted extensively for the WB, ADB, CIDA, CFTC, and UN agencies (ILO, WHO, UNDP). He is the author of 21 academic books and over 100 articles in top academic journals. In retirement, he has started writing historical novels.

Publications

Academic books
.
.
.
.
.
https://turkishcanadians.com/

Historical novels
.

Personal life
Mehmet is married and has three sons; he resides in Ottawa with his wife Karen.

References

Living people
1938 births
Canadian people of Turkish Cypriot descent
Turkish Cypriot emigrants to Canada
People from Nicosia
People from Ottawa
Turkish Cypriot expatriates in the United Kingdom
Academic staff of Carleton University
University of Toronto alumni
Academic staff of University of Windsor
Academic staff of York University
Academic staff of the University of Toronto
Academic staff of the University of Ottawa
Canadian economists
21st-century Canadian novelists
Turkish Cypriot academics
Turkish Cypriot writers
Alumni of the London School of Economics
Canadian male novelists